Round Midnight is an album by guitarist Kenny Burrell recorded in 1972 and released on the Fantasy label.

Reception

Allmusic awarded the album 2 stars with its review by Scott Yanow stating, "Although the music overall is well-played, no real sparks fly and the results often border on being sleepy".

Track listing 
 "A Streetcar Named Desire" (Alex North) - 6:58     
 "Make Someone Happy" (Betty Comden, Adolph Green, Jule Styne) - 5:15     
 "Round Midnight" (Thelonious Monk) - 5:09     
 "I Think It's Going to Rain Today" (Randy Newman) - 4:59     
 "Since I Fell for You" (Buddy Johnson) - 4:43     
 "I'm Gonna Laugh You Right out of My Life" (Cy Coleman, Joseph McCarthy) - 6:40     
 "Blues in the Night" (Harold Arlen, Johnny Mercer) - 3:32

Personnel 
Kenny Burrell - guitar
Joe Sample (track 3), Richard Wyands (tracks 1, 2 & 4-6) - piano
Reggie Johnson - bass (tracks 1-6) 
Lennie McBrowne (tracks 1, 2 & 4-6), Paul Humphrey (track 3) - drums

References 

Kenny Burrell albums
1972 albums
Fantasy Records albums
Instrumental albums